The 1979 Tour de France was the 66th edition of the Tour de France, one of cycling's Grand Tours. The Tour began in Fleurance with a prologue individual time trial on 27 June, and Stage 13 occurred on 10 July with a hilly stage from Metz. The race finished in Paris on 22 July.

Stage 13
10 July 1979 – Metz to Ballon d'Alsace,

Stage 14
11 July 1979 – Belfort to Évian-les-Bains,

Stage 15
12 July 1979 – Évian-les-Bains to Morzine Avoriaz,  (ITT)

Stage 16
13 July 1979 – Morzine Avoriaz to Les Menuires,

Rest day
14 July 1979 – Les Menuires

Stage 17
15 July 1979 – Les Menuires to Alpe d'Huez,

Stage 18
16 July 1979 – Alpe d'Huez to Alpe d'Huez,

Stage 19
17 July 1979 – Alpe d'Huez to Saint-Priest,

Stage 20
18 July 1979 – Saint-Priest to Dijon,

Stage 21
19 July 1979 – Dijon to Dijon,  (ITT)

Stage 22
20 July 1979 – Dijon to Auxerre,

Stage 23
21 July 1979 – Auxerre to Nogent-sur-Marne,

Stage 24
22 July 1979 – Le Perreux-sur-Marne to Paris Champs-Élysées,

Notes

References

1979 Tour de France
Tour de France stages